The 2013 CIS Men's Final 8 Basketball Tournament was held March 8–10, 2013 in Ottawa, Ontario. It was the first of two consecutive CIS Championships to be held at Scotiabank Place (renamed July 2013 as Canadian Tire Centre) after the tournament was held in Halifax in 2011 and 2012. This was the fourth time Carleton University has hosted the tournament, with the most recent being in 2009. Carleton was joined by six other qualifiers and one wild card team. The Carleton Ravens won their ninth title in eleven years. In the process they set a new record for the most CIS Men's basketball championships.

List of participating teams

Championship Bracket

Bronze Medal Bracket

Consolation Bracket

Note: All records are against CIS competition only.

References 

2013
2012–13 in Canadian basketball
Sports competitions in Ottawa